La Ciénega Formation is a Sandbian to Katian geologic formation of south-central Bolivia. The formation comprises silty, clayey, micaceous, fine-grained sandstones with thin intercalations of grey-green to light grey shales.

Fossil content 
The formation has provided the following fossils:
 Dinorthis sp.
 Lingula sp.
 Lingulepis sp.
 Orbiculoidea sp.
 Orthoceras sp.

See also 
 List of fossiliferous stratigraphic units in Bolivia

References

Further reading 
 R. Suárez Soruco. 1976. El sistema ordovícico en Bolivia. Revista Tecnica YPF Bolivia 5(2):111-123

Geologic formations of Bolivia
Ordovician System of South America
Ordovician Bolivia
Katian
Sandbian
Sandstone formations
Shale formations
Ordovician southern paleotemperate deposits
Paleontology in Bolivia
Formations